The Var is a right tributary of the river Olt in Romania. It flows into the Olt in Siculeni, Harghita County.

References

Rivers of Romania
Rivers of Harghita County